Tottenham Hale is a district of north London and part of the London Borough of Haringey, bounded by the River Lea and located to the south/south-east of Tottenham proper. From 1850 to 1965, it was part of the Municipal Borough of Tottenham, in Middlesex.

The area is currently undergoing major regeneration.

Etymology
Tottenham Hale takes its name from the old English word Hale (to hoist or pull), as goods (particularly timber) were unloaded from the River Lea for onward transport by road at this point.

Character of the area

Centred around Tottenham Hale station the area was formerly largely industrial in character with an emphasis on timber related products. The industrial sites have become large residential areas and a retail park. The retail park was looted and set alight in the 2011 England riots. Since then there have been a large-scale housing project constructed, and Haringey Council has formulated plans to redevelop the area.

The east of Tottenham Hale borders the London Borough of Waltham Forest and the Walthamstow Reservoirs including the Walthamstow Wetlands. The River Lea runs through the east of Tottenham Hale. This includes the Tottenham Lock and the Pymmes Brook merging with the river. Surrounding these are a series of residential areas: Hale Village, the Ferry Lane Estate, Heron Wharf and the under construction Hale Wharf development.

Hale Village's design is based on Hammarby Sjöstad in Stockholm, Sweden.

Tottenham Hale is currently part of a major regeneration programme, which includes £1 billion of development investment, backed by Haringey Council and the GLA.

Demography
The district is represented by the Tottenham Hale ward in the London Borough of Haringey. In the 2011 census the ward counted a population of 17,300. The largest ethnic group was Other White, 22%, followed by 18% White British, 16% Black African and 13% Black Caribbean. The median age as of 2013 was 29 years. The life expectancy was 78.1 years for males and 84.0 years for females. The median house price as of 2014 was £251,500, compared to £326,500 in the Tottenham Green ward. A majority (54.4%) of homes in the ward were flats/apartments/maisonettes.

Wildlife
The nearby Walthamstow Reservoirs and River Lea support a variety of waterfowl including herons, geese, swans, moorhens and coots.

The Walthamstow Reservoirs was awarded a Heritage Lottery grant, funding their development into Europe's largest Urban Wetland Park.

The Paddocks Nature Park provides a nesting site for birds such as song thrush, blackbird and various warblers. Weasels and hedgehogs as well as bats reside in the park.

Economy

Tottenham Hale Retail Park

Tottenham Hale Retail Park is a major  retail park located adjacent to the local tube station on Ferry Lane. The site has a total retail space of 200,000 square feet, and is occupied by retailers including Argos, JD Sports, TK Maxx, PC World, Asda and Costa.

Industry
The following companies are or have been located in the Tottenham Hale area:

Education

Transport
Tottenham Hale station is on the Victoria line and also has National Rail Abellio Greater Anglia services. This includes the Stansted Express, the West Anglia Main Line and the Lea Valley Lines. The station is also part of the proposed Crossrail 2 project.

The redevelopment of Tottenham Hale bus station was completed in December 2014. The railway and Underground station is currently under redevelopment. Work has begun on installing an extra National Rail track to increase the frequency of services.

The following bus routes serve the bus station: 41, 76,
123, 192, 230, W4,
N41 and N73.

References

Gallery

Districts of the London Borough of Haringey
Areas of London